SWRMXS is a remix album by Finnish band HIM. It features remix versions of songs featured on their seventh studio album Screamworks: Love in Theory and Practice. Pre-orders began on 12 November 2010, and the album was released on 7 December 2010. In a story told by Valo (according to the official H.I.M. Facebook page), he created the cover for the album late one night after seeing the image in a dream. He went downstairs, broke a VHS tape open, and carefully arranged the tape into a heartagram.

Track listing
"In Venere Veritas" (Huoratron Remix) – 6:33
"In the Arms of Rain" (Salem Remix) – 3:37
"The Foreboding Sense of Impending Happiness" (Morgan Page Remix) – 6:10
"Ode to Solitude" (Gavin Russom Remix) – 9:30
"Heartkiller" (The Mercyfvcks Remix) – 3:25
"Love, the Hardest Way" (Tiësto Remix) – 6:27
"Shatter Me with Hope" (oOoOO Remix) – 4:30
"Dying Song" (Jay Lamar & Jesse Oliver Remix) – 6:36
"Disarm Me (With Your Loneliness)" (VV Remix) – 4:42
"Scared to Death" (Diamond Cut Remix) – 5:41
"Acoustic Funeral" / "Like St. Valentine" / "Katherine Wheel" (ÖÖ Megamix) – 6:18
The 11th track is remixed by HIM vocalist Ville Valo and his brother Jesse Valo under the alias ÖÖ.

External links
 Official HIM Website
 Interviews featuring Gavin Russom, oOoOO, Diamond Cut and Morgan Page

2010 remix albums
HIM (Finnish band) albums
Sire Records remix albums